Dorle is both a surname and a given name. Notable people with the name include:

Avinash K. Dorle (1935–2015), Indian scientist and professor
Dorle Soria (1900–2002), American publicist, record producer, and journalist

See also
Dorge
Dorley